Dev Mohan is an Indian actor and model who works in Malayalam Cinema. His works include the movies Sufiyum Sujatayum and Panthrandu.

Early and personal life 
Dev Mohan was born on 18th September 1992 in Thrissur, Kerala. He did his schooling in Technical High School, Thrissur. After studying Mechanical Engineering from Vidya Academy of Science and Technology, Thrissur, he worked as the team leader in a company in Bangalore. There he started his modelling career. In 2016, he participated in the Peter England Mr. India 2016 conducted in Mumbai and was a finalist in it. In 2020 he married his long time girlfriend Rajina.

Career 
In 2020 Dev Mohan appeared as the title role Sufi, in the movie Sufiyum Sujatayum which was released on Amazon Prime. He was selected for the role through an audition conducted by the crew. After the audition he went on two year preparation for the role learning Arabic and Sufi dance. It took about nine months to perfection the Sufi whirling. He was praised for his performance in the film. Lohesh Balachandran of The India Today wrote that, "Credit of the film goes to both the director and the lead actors, Dev Mohan and Aditi Rao Hydari, who slip into their roles with elan." He got recognition from this film.

After that he did another Malayalam movie Pulli. In 2021 he acted as Dushyanta in the Telugu movie Shaakuntalam opposite to Samantha. The shooting of the movie has completed and the post production works are going on. In 2022, he appeared in the Malayalam movie Panthrandu which was his first movie to have a theatrical release. Regarding his role, a critic noted that "Dev Mohan, looks good in this action thriller, but doesn’t strike the chord he did in his debut romantic role in Sufiyum Sujathayum".

Filmography

Films

Short films

Awards and nominations

References

External links 

Living people
1992 births
Male actors from Kerala
Indian male models
21st-century Indian male actors
Indian male film actors
Male actors in Malayalam cinema
Male actors in Telugu cinema
Male actors from Thrissur
South Indian International Movie Awards winners
Beauty pageant contestants from India